Coleophora galligena is a moth of the family Coleophoridae. It is found in Central Asia (including Turkestan and Uzbekistan), Jordan and Pakistan.

The larvae feed on Haloxylon persicum. They form galls on the branches of their host plant. They are found only on previous year's thin branches. Larvae can be found from August to September and (after hibernation) from April to May.

References

galligena
Moths described in 1979
Moths of Asia